Camilla Waltersson Grönvall (born 19 March 1969) is a Swedish politician. , she serves as Minister for Social Services in the cabinet of Prime Minister Ulf Kristersson.

References 

Living people
1969 births
Place of birth missing (living people)
21st-century Swedish women politicians
Members of the Riksdag from the Moderate Party
Members of the Riksdag 2010–2014
Members of the Riksdag 2014–2018
Members of the Riksdag 2018–2022
Members of the Riksdag 2022–2026
Women members of the Riksdag
Women government ministers of Sweden